Public holidays in Tanzania are in accordance with the Public Holidays Ordinance (Amended) Act, 1966 and are observed throughout the nation.

Background
The Public Holidays Ordinance (Amended) Act, 1966 lists twelve public holidays in its schedule. At present, Tanzania has a total of seventeen public holidays: eight religious holidays, three national holidays, two commemorating the death anniversaries of the inaugural leaders of its constituent states and the remaining four of other national importance.

The President of Tanzania may declare additional holidays at his or her discretion, for example, during the general election day. The President of Zanzibar may do the same within the semi-autonomous islands of Zanzibar. A recent example of this was on 4 November 2015 where President Kikwete announced a national holiday for the next day to celebrate Magufuli winning the presidential election.

List for 2020

List for 2016

* denotes subject to the sighting of the moon

See also
List of holidays by country

References

External links
 Revisiting Tanzania’s lazy, hazy holidays … by Karl Lymo, Business Times

 
Tanzanian culture
Society of Tanzania
Tanzania-related lists
Events in Tanzania
Tanzania